Admiral Yudo Margono (born 26 November 1965) is Indonesian admiral who is currently serving as the 22nd Commander of the Indonesian National Armed Forces, He was appointed by President of Indonesia Joko Widodo in December 2022, replacing the retiring General Andika Perkasa.

Early life and education
Yudo Margono was born in Madiun, East Java on 26 November 1965. His parents were farmers. According to him, after graduating from high school, he along with several friends decided to sign up to join the Indonesian Naval Academy, though he was the only one accepted between his friends. He was assigned to the Indonesian Navy, and graduated from the academy in 1988.

Career
He began his navy career as an assistant to the missile officer aboard KRI Wilhelmus Zakarias Yohannes, then was promoted to head of operations aboard  and executive officer for KRI Fatahillah. He was then given command over the vessels KRI Pandrong, and KRI Ahmad Yani. In 2004, he was appointed commander of the naval base at Tual, then in 2008 in Sorong until 2010. Between 2010 and 2012, he was assigned as escort commander and later training officer of the Eastern Fleet. Between 2014 and 2015, he worked at the naval headquarters, before being assigned to command the naval base at Belawan until 2016. He held the rank of colonel in 2013, when he was training officer.

Yudo Margono became chief of staff of the Western fleet command in 2016–2017, commander of the military sealift command in 2017–2018, and then commander of the western fleet (reorganized into 1st fleet) in 2018–2019. After this tenure, he became joint commander of the 1st defense region, directly under the Commander of the Indonesian National Armed Forces. He had been promoted to rear admiral in December 2017,

As joint commander, Yudo Margono took part in the handling of the COVID-19 outbreak in 2020, particularly hospitals in Galang Island and the Kemayoran Athletes Village. He was appointed navy chief of staff on 20 May 2020, and along with the appointment he was promoted to a four-star admiral. He was awarded the Member (AM) in the Military Division of the Order of Australia on 3 May 2022 for strengthening relations between the navies of Indonesia and Australia.

Honours
Yudo Margono is the recipient of the following honours:

References

1965 births
Chiefs of Staff of the Indonesian Navy
Living people
Indonesian admirals
People from Madiun
Yudo Margono